Emmerson Nathaniel Trotman (born 10 November 1954) is a former West Indies cricketer who played in the role of an allrounder. Trotman featured as right handed batsman for Barbados, the West Indies rebels and Border in his cricketing career. He later served as the head coach of the Netherlands as well as Barbados.

Playing career
Born in Paradise Village, Christ Church, Barbados, Trotman played for Barbados from 1976 to 1983. He then joined the West Indies rebels, playing on their tours to South Africa. Due to the West Indies Cricket Board banning those said cricketers, Trotman's playing days for Barbados thus came to and end. He soon joined up with South African side Border and 1989 he was named as a South African Cricket Annual Cricketer of the Year. Trotman eventually featured for Border for a sum of eight seasons.

Coaching career
When his playing days came to a close Trotman became involved in coaching. He went on to obtain a Level 3 coaching certificate from Cricket South Africa along with a Level 4 coaching certificate from the England and Wales Cricket Board. During 1996 he was appointed head coach of the Netherlands. With him at the helm, the Dutch won the 1998 European Cricket Championship and the 2001 ICC Trophy. They also qualified for the 2002 ICC Champions Trophy and the 2003 World Cup. After eight years with the Dutch, Trotman eventually left the role in June 2005.

References

1954 births
Living people
Barbadian cricketers
Barbados cricketers
Border cricketers
Barbadian cricket coaches
People from Christ Church, Barbados
Coaches of the Netherlands national cricket team